Howard Dean Koplitz (May 4, 1938 – January 2, 2012) was an American professional baseball pitcher who appeared in 54 games, 19 as a starter, over parts of five seasons in Major League Baseball (MLB) (–; –) for the Detroit Tigers and Washington Senators.

Koplitz signed with the Tigers out of Oshkosh High School in 1956.  In 1961, his sixth season in the Detroit farm system, he posted a 23–3 (.885) won–lost record and was selected the Most Valuable Player of the Double A Southern Association. The performance earned Koplitz his first taste of the majors when rosters were expanded to 40 men after September 1. In his first game in the big leagues, at Fenway Park on September 8, the first batter he faced was future Baseball Hall of Famer Carl Yastrzemski, whom he struck out.

Koplitz went 9–7, with two complete games, one save and a 4.21 earned run average during his MLB career. He allowed 187 hits and 80 bases on balls in 175 innings pitched, with 87 strikeouts.

He handled 47 total chances (12 putouts, 35 assists) perfectly without an error for a perfect 1.000 fielding percentage in his major league career.

References

External links
, or Retrosheet, or Venezuelan Winter League

MLB.com – Obituary

1938 births
2012 deaths
Augusta Tigers players
Baseball players from Wisconsin
Birmingham Barons players
Denver Bears players
Detroit Tigers players
Durham Bulls players
Hawaii Islanders players
Houston Buffs players
Idaho Falls Russets players
Jamestown Falcons players
Knoxville Smokies players
Louisville Colonels (minor league) players
Major League Baseball pitchers
Sportspeople from Oshkosh, Wisconsin
Syracuse Chiefs players
Tacoma Giants players
Tigres de Aragua players
American expatriate baseball players in Venezuela
Toronto Maple Leafs (International League) players
Washington Senators (1961–1971) players
York White Roses players
Indios de Mayagüez players
American expatriate baseball players in Canada